Sajid Hussain Turi (born 12 February 1977) is a Pakistani politician who has been a member of the National Assembly of Pakistan since August 2018. Previously, he was a member of the National Assembly from 2008 to May 2018.
who is the current Federal Minister for Overseas Pakistanis and Human resources and development

Early life

He was born on 12 February 1977.

He is the brother of Sajjad Hussain Turi.

Political career

He was elected to the National Assembly of Pakistan as an independent candidate from Constituency NA-37 (Tribal Area-II) in 2008 Pakistani general election. He received 26,287 votes and defeated an independent candidate Syed Riaz Hussain.

He was re-elected to the National Assembly as an independent candidate Constituency NA-37 (Tribal Area-II) in 2013 Pakistani general election. He received 29,623 votes and defeated an independent candidate, Sayed Qaisar Hussain.

He was re-elected to the National Assembly as a candidate of Pakistan Peoples Party (PPP) from Constituency NA-46 (Tribal Area-VII) in 2018 Pakistani general election. He received 21,461 votes and defeated Syed Iqbal Mian, a candidate of Pakistan Tehreek-e-Insaf.

References

Living people
Pashtun people
Pakistani MNAs 2013–2018
People from Kurram District
1977 births
Pakistani MNAs 2008–2013
Pakistani MNAs 2018–2023